Lens is a genus of flowering plant in the legume family mostly known for its edible seeds, which are referred to as lentils. Lens contains four species of small, erect or climbing herbs with pinnate leaves, small inconspicuous white flowers, and small flattened pods. The lentil most commonly eaten is the seed of Lens culinaris.

Phylogeny 
The genus Lens is generally divided into a few related "gene pool" groups that guide crossing. Wong et al., 2015 reports a SNP-derived phylogeny as:

The non-accepted names (per ILDIS) are suffixed with their accepted counterparts.

References

Fabeae
Fabaceae genera
Taxa named by Philip Miller